Mylanji is a 1982 Indian Malayalam film, written by Moidu Padiyath directed by M. Krishnan Nair. The film's musical score was by A. T. Ummer. Mylanji also means henna in Malayalam and Tamil.

Cast
Janardhanan as Moideen
K.R.Vijaya as Moideen's illegal wife
Shubha as Moideen's legal wife
Ambika as Shahitha Moideen's illegal daughter
Shanavas as Mansoor
Lalu Alex 
Anjali NaiduMoideen's legal daughter 
Balan K. Nair as Abdul Rahman Haji 
Sankaradi as Beenran Kunju
Mala Aravindan as Moosa

Soundtrack
The music was composed by A. T. Ummer and the lyrics were written by P. Bhaskaran.

References

External links
 

1982 films
1980s Malayalam-language films
Films directed by M. Krishnan Nair